Shona Lee (born 19 August 1988) is a retired Singaporean-born New Zealand female tennis player.

Lee has won one doubles titles on the ITF circuit in her career. On 22 October 2007, she reached her best singles ranking of world number 583. On 21 July 2008, she peaked at world number 407 in the doubles rankings.

Shona Lee retired from tennis 2010.

Playing for New Zealand Fed Cup team at the Fed Cup, Lee has a win–loss record of 2–1.

Lee made her WTA main draw debut at the 2009 ASB Classic, in the doubles main draw partnering Kairangi Vano. They lost their only match to Edina Gallovits-Hall and Eva Hrdinová; and earned $860 in prize money.

Fed Cup participation

Doubles

ITF finals (1–3)

Doubles (1–3)

ITF junior results

Singles (0/1)

Doubles (2/3)

References

External links 
 
 

1988 births
Living people
New Zealand female tennis players
Singaporean emigrants to New Zealand
21st-century New Zealand women